Huangfu Mi (215–282), courtesy name Shi'an, was a Chinese physician, essayist, historian, poet, and writer who lived through the late Eastern Han dynasty, Three Kingdoms period and early Western Jin dynasty. He was born in a poor farming family in present-day Sanli village, Chaona, Pingliang, despite being a great-grandson of the famous general Huangfu Song, via Song's son Huangfu Shuxian.

Notable works 
Between 256 and 260, toward the end of the state of Cao Wei, he compiled the Canon of Acupuncture and Moxibustion, a collection of various texts on acupuncture written in earlier periods. This book in 12 volumes further divided into 128 chapters was one of the earliest systematic works on acupuncture and moxibustion, and it proved to be one of the most influential. Huangfu Mi also compiled ten books in a series called Records of Emperors and Kings. He was also the coauthor of Biographies of Exemplary Women (Chinese: 列女傳; pinyin: Liènǚ Zhuàn).

See also
 Lists of people of the Three Kingdoms

References

External links
 

215 births
282 deaths
3rd-century Chinese historians
3rd-century Chinese physicians
Cao Wei essayists
Cao Wei historians
Cao Wei poets
Cao Wei science writers
Jin dynasty (266–420) essayists
Jin dynasty (266–420) historians
Jin dynasty (266–420) poets
Jin dynasty (266–420) science writers